Attorney General Field may refer to:

Alexander Pope Field (1800–1876), Attorney General of Louisiana
James G. Field (1826–1901), Attorney General of Virginia
Richard Stockton Field (1803–1870), Attorney General of New Jersey

See also
General Field (disambiguation)